Michael O. Steinitz is a professor of physics at St. Francis Xavier University. He spearheads the Antigonish Performing Arts Series for the town of Antigonish. From 1998 to 1999, Steinitz was the president of the Canadian Association of Physicists.

References

Canadian physicists
Academic staff of St. Francis Xavier University
Year of birth missing (living people)
Living people
Presidents of the Canadian Association of Physicists